Jack William Brittain is a professor at the David Eccles School of Business at the University of Utah, and served as dean from 1999 to 2008. He holds the Pierre Lassonde Presidential Chair in Entrepreneurship.

References 

Living people
University of Utah faculty
Year of birth missing (living people)
University of California, Berkeley alumni